Yasmine Kittles is an American musician, actress, and performance artist. She is a member of the bands Tearist, Former Ghosts, and Low Red Center. About her stage performances, Rolling Stone has written, "Aided by her hair-raising yelp – a voice ranging from an operatic shriek to a post-Lydia Lunch growl – Kittles is thunder onstage, her assault uniquely confrontational and her crowd's response visceral." She also writes for VICE Magazine as a guest columnist.

Early life 
Kittles was born in Frankfurt, Germany. As a child she moved from Germany to Tehran, Iran to residing in Dallas, Texas where she began figure skating. Kittles was a competitive figure skater with the ISI and USFSA for twelve years. She holds a Bachelor of Arts in Theatre and Dance with a concentration in Meisner technique and a minor in Psychology from the University of Texas at Austin.

Discography
VOCALS, INSTRUMENTS & PERFORMANCE

TEARIST

Former Ghosts

Low Red Center

Spoon

...And You Will Know Us By The Trail Of Dead

Pictureplane

Cerebral Ballzy

Heavy Seals

Filmography 
{| class="wikitable" 
!Title 
!Role 
!Year 
!Notes 
|- 
|Wedding Peach 
|Ranbo 
|2005 
|Co-starring (VO) 
|- 
|Gretchen  
|Marla Auschussler  
|2006 
|WON - Best Dramatic Feature - Los Angeles Film Festival 
|- 
|All American Orgy 
|Yasmine 
|2009 
|Starring 
|- 
|In Lust I 
|Her/ Yasmine 
|2009 
|Co-Creator, Starring 
|- 
|Pound House 
|Jasmine 
|2013 - 2014 
|Starring, 4 Episodes 
|- 
|Video Town 
|Judy 
|2013 
|Co-starring 
|- 
|In Lust III 
|Her/ Yasmine 
|2015 
|Co-Creator, Starring 
|- 
|The 4TH|Jenny 
|2016 
|Starring 
|}

 Television 

Other works
 SAY IT!  - Digital Lips - Everyday Edition App, as LIPS (2009)
 SAY IT!  - Digital Lips - Office Edition App, as LIPS  (2009)
 SAY IT!'' - Digital Lips - Lite App, as LIPS (2009)

References

External links
 

Year of birth missing (living people)
Living people
American women rock singers
American women pop singers
American women in electronic music
American film actresses
American women performance artists
American performance artists
21st-century American women